The Hanover Trust Company was a private American bank of the 1920s. Its offices were located in Boston, Massachusetts.

It became infamous initially for turning down Charles Ponzi for a loan of 2,000 dollars (for his IRC scheme) in 1919, and subsequently for being bought up by Charles Ponzi in July 1920.

References 

1920 in the United States
History of Boston
Charles Ponzi